Aloe prostrata (previously Lomatophyllum prostratum) is a species of Aloe indigenous to Antsiranana Province (Ankarana), Madagascar. Here it grows in shady forests overlying limestone.

Description
This species is low-growing, non-caulescent rosette, with long (15-20mm), narrow (1.5-2mm), curved, dark-green leaves. The dark leaves have many pale, confluent spots and small (3mm) marginal teeth. 
The plant is mildly stoloniferous, and can form clumps. The flowers are red, and are born on a simple, cylindrical inflorescence. The fruits are long-lasting berries.

Aloe prostrata subsp. pallida
The subspecies pallida can be distinguished by its pallid colour.  It has both paler leaves (light-green) and paler flowers (pinkish or yellow).

Relatives
It is part of a group of aloes which all bear fleshy berries, and were therefore classed as a separate group, Lomatophyllum. 
Within this group it is closely related to the solitary, faintly lineate species Aloe sakarahensis.

References

prostrata
Endemic flora of Madagascar
Taxa named by Joseph Marie Henry Alfred Perrier de la Bâthie